Raiamas batesii is a species of cyprinid fish in the genus Raiamas. It occurs in the Dja River, Sanaga River and Nyong River in Cameroon where it forms part of a fishery.

References 

Endemic fauna of Cameroon
Raiamas
Cyprinid fish of Africa
Fish described in 1914